Nepal Democratic Congress was a political party in Nepal. It was formed by Subarna Shamsher Rana, Surya Prasad Upadhyaya, Mahendra Bikram Shah and others from Rana-Shah family.

It merged with the Nepali National Congress led by BP Koirala and others on 27 Chaitra(?) 2006 to form present day Nepali Congress.

History

Nepali Congress formation, 1946–1950 
The Nepali Congress Party was formed by the merger of Nepali National Congress and Nepal Democratic Congress. The Nepali National Congress was founded by Matrika Prasad Koirala in Calcutta, India on 25 January 1946. The Nepal Democratic Congress was founded by Subarna Shumsher Rana in Calcutta on 4 August 1948. The two parties merged on 10 April 1950 to form the Nepali Congress and Koirala became its first president. The party called for an armed revolution against the Rana regime.

During the Bairgania Conference in Bairgania, Bihar, on 27 September 1950 the Nepali Congress announced an armed revolution against the Rana regime. The president of the party also announced the liquidation of operations in India and that the party would operate only inside Nepal.

After King Tribhuvan took refuge inside the Indian Embassy on 6 November 1950. The Congress Liberation Army decided to take this opportunity to launch attacks against the regime before the King "left Nepalese soil". Matrika and Bisheshwor Prasad Koirala and Subarna Shamsher Rana flew to Purnia, Bihar. They called the commanders posted at different locations inside Nepal to prepare for armed strikes near the Nepal-India border.

On 11 November 1950, at midnight Birgunj was attacked, and by 12 November it fell to the Nepali Congress and the first "People's Government" was declared. The liberation army was able to control most of the eastern hills of Nepal and the town of Tansen in Palpa. After pressure by the Indian government and the mass movement by the Nepali Congress and other political parties, the Rana government finally submitted to their demands and King Tribhuvan returned to the throne, replacing King Gyanendra, who had been crowned king after King Tribhuvan left for India.

See also
 Nepali Congress
 Nepali National Congress
 Subarna Shamsher Rana

References

Political parties in Nepal
Defunct political parties in Nepal
Nepali Congress